The Tolland-class attack cargo ships were built by North Carolina Shipbuilding Co. in Wilmington, North Carolina during the latter stages of World War II.

All these ships were built on the same standard hull design, but there were some differences from ship to ship. The armament varied, as did that of the other ships of the day. During 1944-1945, the 5"/38 was recognized as the best gun for the dual role of antiaircraft and naval gunfire support, and the 40 mm was seen as the best antiaircraft gun. The older 20 mm and .50 caliber guns had been recognized to be of limited value, and were being phased out, though they appeared on some of these ships. The 20 mm guns were later removed from all of them, but it is not clear just when this happened.

The complement varied as well, but the DANFS figures sometimes seem to confuse ship's company with embarked troops in determining a ship's complement.

Ships in Class

See also
 
 
 
 
 List of United States Navy amphibious warfare ships

References

External links
United States Maritime Commission C2 Type Ships

Amphibious warfare vessel classes